Cold Creek may refer to:

Arts, entertainment, and media
 Cold Creek County, a Canadian country rock group
 Cold Creek Manor, a 2003 American horror thriller film

Places
 Cold Creek (Russian River tributary), a watercourse in Mendocino County, California, United States
 Cold Creek, Nevada, United States, an unincorporated community
 Cold Creek Conservation Area, a protected Area of Natural and Scientific Interest in Ontario, Canada
 Cold Creek Correctional Facility, a former prison in Lauerdale County, Tennessee, United States